Lakewood High School may refer to:

Lakewood High School (California) — Lakewood, California
Lakewood High School (Colorado) — Lakewood, Colorado
Lakewood High School (Florida) — St. Petersburg, Florida
Lakewood High School (Lake Odessa, Michigan) — Lake Odessa, Michigan
Lakewood High School (New Jersey) — Lakewood, New Jersey
Lakewood High School (North Carolina) — Salemburg, North Carolina
Lakewood High School (Hebron, Ohio) — Hebron, Ohio
Lakewood High School (Lakewood, Ohio) — Lakewood, Ohio
Lakewood High School (Sumter, South Carolina) — Sumter, South Carolina
Lakewood High School (Washington) — North Lakewood, Washington